Lakeside School District is a public school district based in Lake Village, Arkansas, United States. The Lakeside School District encompasses  of land including all or portions of Chicot County and Ashley County communities. Incorporated places within the district include Lake Village in Chicot County, and Montrose in Ashley County. It also serves the Chicot County unincorporated area of Ross Van Ness.

Lakeside School District provides early childhood, elementary and secondary education for more than 1,200 prekindergarten through grade 12 at its five schools.  Lakeside School District schools are accredited by the Arkansas Department of Education (ADE).

History
On February 13, 2006, the Eudora School District consolidated into the Lakeside School District.

Schools 
 Secondary education
 Lakeside High School—grades 9 through 12.
 Lakeside Middle School—grades 6 through 8.

 Ełementary education
 Lakeside Upper Elementary School—grades 3 through 5
 Lakeside Lower Elementary School—prekindergarten through grade 2.
 Eudora Elementary School—prekindergarten through grade 3.

References

Further reading
Maps of predecessor districts:
 (Download)

External links 
 

School districts in Arkansas
Education in Chicot County, Arkansas
Education in Ashley County, Arkansas
Lake Village, Arkansas